HMS Glenmore was an  frigate launched in 1796. She was sold in 1814.

Construction
HMS Glenmore was ordered and laid down as HMS Tweed, but was renamed on 30 October 1795, before her launch. She and her sister ship  were constructed of fir. The motive for the use of pine – an inferior material for shipbuilding – was speed of construction. It was much quicker to build a ship with this material than one of oak; the drawback was that these fir-built ships were less durable than oak-built ships. The two fir-built ships underwent design alterations necessary for fir wood, notably a flat, square tuck stern.

Career
Captain George Duff commissioned Glenmore in April 1796 for the North Sea. She was on the Irish station between 1797 and 1798, and thereafter. Bergère was carrying Victor Hugues as a passenger. The French vessels had with them the East Indiaman , which they had captured the same morning; René Lemarant de Kerdaniel was captain of the prize crew on Calcutta. Glenmore recaptured Calcutta while Aimable engaged Sirène and Bergère. A 35-minute action ensued before the two French vessels departed. Sirène had as prisoners Captain Haggy, Calcuttas master, her first and second mates, and 50 of her lascars and seamen. Calcutta arrived in Plymouth on 12 January 1800. On 18 January 50 lascars were landed from Calcutta and taken to China House, which served as a hospital. The lascars were sick and suffering from the cold. 

Glenmore returned to Plymouth from Cork on 6 February. six days later she came into Plymouth again and went up the harbour to undergo a refit. She went into dock on 19 March. She sailed again on 10 June. During her refit at Plymouth the naval architect Robert Seppings introduced, as an experiment, diagonal trusses that reduced hogging.

Glenmore captured the French schooner Esperance and recaptured two British merchant vessels, William and Salem. The French privateer Minerve had captured William, LeQuesne, master, as William was sailing from the West Indies to Guernsey. William arrived at Cork.

Glenmore and  escorted to Madeira the fleet for the West Indies from Cork and Portsmouth. They left Madeira on 29 October. Glenmore was to continue with the fleet some distance to the southwest before returning to her station.

In January 1801 Captain Duff transferred to the 74-gun third rate ship of the line . Captain John Talbot replaced him on Glenmore. Glenmore continued to serve on the Irish station.

On 15 May 1801 Lloyd's List (LL) reported that Glenmore had recaptured two merchant vessels that had fallen prey to the French privateer Braave. One vessel was Camilla, Preston, master, which had been sailing from Grenada to Liverpool. The other was Guiana Planter, Wedge, master, which had been sailing from St Kitts to Portsmouth. Glenmore sent Guiana Planter into Cork.

Braave later captured six more merchant vessels, Victory, Vine, Ann, Urania, Cecilia, and Urania. Braave put all her prisoners on Ann, Silk, master, and let her go. Glenmore recaptured Urania and set off after Braave. Glenmore then recaptured West Indian, Victory, Vine, and Cecilia. They and Urania all arrived at Cork.

In June 1802 Glenmore escorted , Lieutenant Donocliff, to Plymouth. Engageante had been a hospital and then receiving ship at Cork. Although it was expected that Engageante would be broken up at Plymouth, that did not occur until 1811.

In July 1802 Captain John Maitland replaced Talbot. There they were to pick up Dutch troops to return to Holland.

In December Maitland commissioned .

Glenmore was fitted as a receiving ship at Plymouth. She remained there in Ordinary.

Fate
The "Principal Officers and Commissioners of His Majesty's Navy" offered "Glenmore, of 36 guns and 926 tons", lying at Plymouth, for sale on 3 November 1814. She sold there on that date for £1,990.

Citations and references
Citations

References
  
 

1796 ships
Frigates of the Royal Navy